Erik Persson (19 November 1909 – 1 February 1989) was a Swedish football forward who played for AIK. He also played for Team Sweden at the 1936 Summer Olympics, and at the 1938 FIFA World Cup in France. 

His brother was boxer Harry Persson.

References

External links

1909 births
1989 deaths
Swedish footballers
Sweden international footballers
Association football forwards
AIK Fotboll players
1938 FIFA World Cup players
AIK Fotboll managers
Allsvenskan players
AIK IF players
Olympic footballers of Sweden
Footballers at the 1936 Summer Olympics
Swedish football managers